The 15th Central American Championships in Athletics were held at the Estadio Cementos Progreso in Guatemala City, Guatemala, between June 20-21, 2003. 

A total of 41 events were contested, 21 by men and 20 by women.

Medal summary
Complete results and medal winners were published.

Men

Women

Medal table (unofficial)

Team Ranking
Guatemala won the overall team ranking.

Total

References

  
Central American Championships in Athletics
Central American Championships in Athletics
Central American Championships in Athletics
Sport in Guatemala City
International athletics competitions hosted by Guatemala